Kalecik, Gündoğmuş is a village in the District of Gündoğmuş, Antalya Province, Turkey.

References

Villages in Gündoğmuş District